Beileid is an EP by jazz/ambient band Bohren & der Club of Gore, released on June 28, 2011, by Ipecac Recordings. It features a cover of the song "Catch My Heart" by German heavy metal band Warlock. This cover is also the first track by the band to feature vocals.

Track listing

 "Zombies Never Die (Blues) " – 7:31
 "Catch My Heart" (featuring Mike Patton) – 13:16
 "Beileid" – 14:21

Personnel
Thorsten Benning – drums
Christoph Clöser – Fender Rhodes, vibraphone, tenor and baritone saxophone
Morten Gass – bass, organ, vocoder, synthesizer
Robin Rodenberg – bass
Mike Patton – vocals

References

2011 EPs
Bohren & der Club of Gore albums
Ipecac Recordings albums